For lists of Shinto shrines, see:

List of Shinto shrines in Japan
List of Shinto shrines in Kyoto
List of Shinto shrines outside Japan
List of Shinto shrines in Taiwan
List of Shinto shrines in the United States

See also
List of Jingū
List of Tōshō-gū

 List